Duncan Woods (born 4 March 1978) is a South African male water polo player. He was a member of the South Africa men's national water polo team, playing as a centre back. He was a part of the  team at the World Championships, most recently at the 2007 and 2009 World Aquatics Championships.

He is married to field hockey player Kate Woods.

References

South African male water polo players
Place of birth missing (living people)
1978 births
Living people